Kinder Versions is the fourth studio album by Icelandic band Mammút. It was released in July 2017 under Bella Union.

Track listing

References

2017 albums
Bella Union albums